Lea Mack (a native of Pickerington, Ohio, born 1973) was Miss Ohio 1994.

Lea Mack was Miss Ohio for 1994, and she placed in the top ten for Miss America.  She has been a professional music therapist, spokeswoman, and author. Lea is currently the owner of her own company, Dream Big Enterprises, L.L.C.

Education
Lea Mack relieved a bachelor's degree in music therapy from Florida State University.

References

External links
Mack as a speaker

1973 births
Living people
Florida State University alumni
Miss America 1995 delegates
People from Pickerington, Ohio
20th-century American people